The International Piano Competition of Orléans is an international piano competition dedicated exclusively to music of the XXth-XXIst centuries that is held biannually in Orléans, France. The only of its kind as of 2022., the competition has been founded in 1994 by French pianist and pedagogue Françoise Thinat, is a member of the World Federation of International Music Competitions and a partner of Busoni Competition.

For every edition, a piece is commissioned from one of internationally established composers as an obligatory piece for the competitors. Among those who has written for the competition are Pascal Dusapin, Pierre Jodlowski and Philippe Manoury. The jury has included, over the years, such names as Idil Biret, Claude Helffer, François-Frédéric Guy and Unsuk Chin.

History
In 1989 Francoise Thinat has founded an association which was supposed to promote piano music of the XXth century, and the first edition of the competition took place in 1994. She imagined

Starting 1998, every participant should include a work by a young composer of choice, and a composition prize is awarded to the composer of the piece deemed best by the jury. Six years after, in 2004, the first edition for children «Brin d'herbe» took place

Laureates

See also
 List of classical music competitions

References

External links
 Website of the International Piano Competition of Orléans

1994 establishments in France
Recurring events established in 1994
Piano competitions
Music competitions in France
Orléans